Shira Perlmutter (born 1956) is an American lawyer and law professor and the 14th Register of Copyrights. Perlmutter has given public lectures on copyright, stating that Americans desire copyright laws that make sense, that are fair, and that reflect the technologies currently in use. She has stated a desire for laws that keep pace with technology.

Perlmutter was the chief policy officer and director for international affairs at the United States Patent and Trademark Office. She is a research fellow at the Oxford Intellectual Property Research Centre at Oxford University. She co-authored a leading casebook: International Intellectual Property Law and Policy.

Prior to that, she was Executive Vice President for Global Legal Policy at the International Federation of the Phonographic Industry. She was Vice President and Associate General Counsel for Intellectual Property Policy at Time Warner. In 1995, she was appointed to be the first Associate Register for Policy and International Affairs at the U.S. Copyright Office. She was the copyright consultant to the Clinton Administration’s Advisory Council on the National Information Infrastructure in 1994–95.

Early life and education
Perlmutter was born to Daniel Perlmutter, a chemical engineering professor, and Felice Davidson Perlmutter, a social administration professor. She has a brother, Saul, and a sister, Tova. She has an A.B. from Harvard University and a J.D. from the University of Pennsylvania.

References

1956 births
Living people
United States Registers of Copyright
University of Pennsylvania Law School alumni
Harvard College alumni